The Hvítá bridge (unofficial name) is a single-lane road bridge opened in 1928 traversing the Hvítá river in western Iceland. Until the opening of the bridge over the Borgarfjörður at Borgarnes in 1981, it was part of the main road connection between northern and southern Iceland. On the 2002 anniversary convention of Verkfræðingafélag Islands, the Icelandic engineering association, the bridge was awarded the most outstanding Icelandic engineering project of the 1921-1930 decade.

Position 

Construction 
The bridge was designed by Árni Pálsson (1897–1970), an Icelandic engineer. As it was common practice for Icelandic road bridges of that time, it was designed a single-lane bridge. The designated construction costs of 169.000 Icelandic krónas could be adhered to approximately. The opening ceremony on 1 November 1928 was attended by prime minister Tryggvi Þórhallsson and 500 others despite cold and snowy weather.

External links 

 Photo gallery

References 

Borgarbyggð
Bridges in Iceland
Arch bridges
Concrete bridges
Transport infrastructure completed in 1928